Bruce P. Cooke (born 2 February 1952) was a rugby union player who represented Australia.

Cooke, a fullback, was born in Brisbane, Queensland and claimed one international rugby cap for Australia.

References

Australian rugby union players
Australia international rugby union players
Rugby union fullbacks
1952 births
Rugby union players from Brisbane
Living people